Novokhazino (Yañı Xajı) is a rural locality (a village) in Kuyanovsky Selsoviet, Krasnokamsky District, Bashkortostan, Russia. The population was 339 as of 2010. There are 5 streets.

Geography 
Novokhazino is located 56 km southeast of Nikolo-Beryozovka (the district's administrative centre) by road. Taktalachuk is the nearest rural locality.

References 

Rural localities in Krasnokamsky District